The 1910 Villanova Wildcats football team represented Villanova University as an independent during the 1910 college football season. Led by seventh-year head coach Fred Crolius, Villanova compiled a record of 0–4–2. The 1910 campaign was the first of two consecutive winless seasons for Villanova.

Schedule

References

Villanova
Villanova Wildcats football seasons
College football winless seasons
Villanova Wildcats Football